Semisulcospira forticosta is a species of freshwater snail with an operculum, an aquatic gastropod mollusk in the family Semisulcospiridae.

Distribution 
This species occurs in South Chungcheong Province, South Korea. The type locality is Mungyeong in Korea.

Description
The female reproductive system was described by Prozorova & Rasshepkina in 2005.

References

External links

Semisulcospiridae